Demente is a Chilean telenovela created by Pablo Illanes for Mega. It aired from March 15, 2021 to November 23, 2021. It stars Paz Bascuñán, Benjamín Vicuña, and Francisco Pérez-Bannen.

The series revolves around the tragedy of a family faced with a crime that will change and destroy their lives.

Cast 
 Paz Bascuñán as Teresa Betancourt Sarmiento
 Benjamín Vicuña as Joaquín Acevedo Soto
 Francisco Pérez-Bannen as Comisario Gonzalo Leiva
 Íngrid Cruz as Inspector Javiera Cáceres
 Andrés Velasco as Dante Covarrubias Otero / Jorge
 Patricia Rivadeneira as Flavia Betancourt Sarmiento
 Gonzalo Valenzuela as Emiliano Betancourt Sarmiento
 Alejandra Araya as Bianca Rosseti
 Paulo Brunetti as Álvaro Infante Castro
 Lorena Capetillo as Gaby Ortúzar
 Constanza Mackenna as Fernanda Cerutti 
 María José Bello as Patricia Aguirre
 Rodrigo Soto as Oscar Saldaña
 Fernanda Ramirez as Maira Sánchez
 Victoria de Gregorio as Miranda Covarrubias Betancourt
 Paulina Moreno as Melissa Rodríguez Ulloa / Caro
 Manuel Castro Volpato as Pascal Mackenna
 Alondra Valenzuela as Laura Acevedo Betancourt
 Rafael García-Huidobro as Mateo Acevedo Betancourt / Nachito
 Hellen Mrugalski as María José "Coty" Betancourt Rosseti 
 Aída Caballero as Viviana "Vivi" Betancourt Rosseti
 Josefa Espinoza as Ana María Leiva Aguirre
 Ágatha del Valle as Sofía Leiva Aguirre

Ratings

References

External links 
 

2021 telenovelas
2021 Chilean television series debuts
2021 Chilean television series endings
Chilean telenovelas
Mega (Chilean TV channel) telenovelas
Spanish-language telenovelas